In mathematics, a right group is an algebraic structure consisting of a set together with a binary operation that combines two elements into a third element while obeying the right group axioms. The right group axioms are similar to the group axioms, but while groups can have only one identity and any element can have only one inverse, right groups allow for multiple  identity elements and multiple   inverse elements.

It can be proven (theorem 1.27 in ) that a right group is isomorphic to the direct product of a right zero semigroup and a group, while a right abelian group is the direct product of a right zero semigroup and an abelian group. Left group and left abelian group are defined in analogous way, by substituting right for left in the definitions. The rest of this article will be mostly concerned about right groups, but everything applies to left groups by doing the appropriate right/left substitutions.

Definition 
A right group, originally called multiple group, is a set  with a binary operation ⋅, satisfying the following axioms:

 Closure
 Associativity
 Left identity element
Such an element does not need to be unique.
 Right inverse elements

Examples

Direct product of finite sets 
The following example is provided by.

 is the right zero semigroup of order 2.

The direct product  of these two structures is defined as follows:

 The  operation is defined element-wise:
 Formula 1: 
The elements of  will look like  and so on.

Here are some facts about :

Some examples:

 Each element has two right inverses.

Complex numbers in polar coordinates 
Clifford gives a second example involving complex numbers. Given two non-zero complex numbers a and b, the following operation forms a right group:
 
All complex numbers with modulus equal to 1 are left identities, and all complex numbers will have a right inverse with respect to any left identity.

(this is not the regular multiplication of complex numbers) then becomes . If we represent the magnitudes and arguments as ordered pairs, we can write this as:
 Formula 2: 
This right group is the direct product of a group (positive real numbers under multiplication) and a right zero semigroup induced by the real numbers. Structurally, this is identical to formula 1 above. In fact, this is how all right group operations look like when written as ordered pairs of the direct product of their factors.

Complex numbers in cartesian coordinates 
If we take the and complex numbers and define an operation similar to example 2 but use  cartesian instead of polar coordinates and addition instead of multiplication, we get another right group, with operation defined as follows:

  , or equivalently:
  Formula 3:

A practical example from computer science 
Consider the following example from computer science, where a set would be implemented as a programming language type.

 Let  be the set of date times in an arbitrary programming language.

If we treat these transformations as right semigroup actions,  behaves like a right zero semigroup, such that a time zone transformation always cancels any previous time zone transformation on a given date time.

This composite transformation of time zone conversion and duration adding is isomorphic to the right group .

Taking the java.time package as an example, the sets  and  would correspond to the class ZonedDateTime, the function plus and the function withZoneSameInstant, respectively. More concretely, for any ZonedDateTime t1 and t2, there is a Duration d and a ZoneId z, such that:

 t2 = t1.plus(d).withZoneSomeInstant(z)

The expression above can be written more concisely using right action notation borrowed from group theory as:
 
It can also be verified that durations and time zones, when viewed as transformations on date/times, in addition to obeying the axioms of groups and right zero semigroups, respectively, they commute with each other. That is, for any date/time t, any duration d and any timezone z:
 
This is the same as saying:

References 

Algebraic structures
Semigroup theory